The Colombian presidential sash is regulated by art. No. 192. The text of said article is as follows: Article 4 - The Band that distinguishes the Head of State, authorized by the Senate, will display the same colors as the flag, in the same position, and the coat of arms. This badge will end with two tassels with no other emblem. Both the shield and the tassel will be made with gold-plated threads, of excellent quality and maximum inalterability over time.

The blade is 10 cm wide with three stripes, the Yellow wider than the last two that will be of the same width, the Blue and red. It is made in one piece of cloth made in both colors, there are different models of Presidential Sash. Some of them had the erroneous war shield, enclosed in a red circle, instead of the coat of arms alone, as required by protocol.

Bibliography 
Banda presidencial de Colombia

References 

Presidency of Colombia
Government of Colombia